"Love Is Lost" is a 2013 David Bowie song.

Love Is Lost may also refer to:

"Love Is Lost", by L'Âme Immortelle from the albums ...In einer Zukunft aus Tränen und Stahl
"Love Is Lost", by Wise Dome featuring Supastition

See also
Love Lost (disambiguation)